Keiko Lee (born February 17, 1965) is a Japanese jazz singer of Korean ethnicity. She has performed regularly outside Japan.

Discography
 Imagine (1995)
 Kickin' it with Keiko Lee (1996)
 Beautiful Love (1997)
 If it's Love (1998)
 Sings Super Standards (2002)
 In Essence (2007)
 Delight (2008)
 Another Side of Keiko Lee (2008)
 Fragile (2009)
 Smooth (2010)
 Love XX (2015)

References

External links 
 Official site

Living people
1965 births
Place of birth missing (living people)
Japanese people of Korean descent
Japanese women jazz singers
20th-century Japanese women singers
20th-century Japanese singers
21st-century Japanese women singers
21st-century Japanese singers